North Shoebury (once known as Shoebury Parva and Little Shoebury) is a suburb of the city of Southend-on-Sea, in the City of Southend-on-Sea, in the ceremonial county of Essex, England.

North Shoebury was once an ecclesiastical parish. The 1870-2 gazetteer entry reads:

North Shoebury was, until 1 October 1933, additionally a civil parish; on this date it was abolished and administration split between Southend-on-Sea and Great Wakering parishes.

To this day, there is still a divide between North and South Shoeburyness; the south of the town has the Garrison, Shoeburyness High School, Shoebury East Beach, Shoebury Common Beach, some industrial estates and is the site of a new Lidl (on the former Gunners Park). The most expensive housing tends to be clustered around the converted former Garrison and along Shoebury Common seafront. The North has an Asda supermarket, several public houses including The Parsons Barn, The Meadowlark and The Angel Inn and is otherwise predominantly residential.

References

External links 

Villages in Essex
Populated coastal places in Essex
Southend-on-Sea (town)
Former civil parishes in Essex